

Location
Sagargad Fort सागरगड is located in Alibag taluka of Raigad District. The path to the fort starts from Khandale village on Alibag-Pen Road. This fort can be visited all round the year. A gentle walk of 2 hours from the village Khandale can reach us up to the fort. There is a small temple of Mahishasurmardini and a water tank on the way. Also, there is "Dodhane" waterfall on the way. The beauty of the waterfall can be seen in Monsoon. There is a Siddheshwar monastery on the Sagargad machi. The pedestrians can make a night halt in the monastery.

History
Very less is known about this fort. Shivaji Maharaj won this fort from Adilshah in 1660 A.D.Sagargad was one of the 23 forts which were handed over to Moghuls in the Treaty of Purandar. It was one of the 16 fortified posts that were given to Kanhoji Angre by Balaji Vishwanath Peshwa in 1713. Prisoners sentenced to death were said to be hurled down from the monkey point of the fort.

Gallery

 List of forts in Maharashtra
 List of forts in India
 Marathi People
 Maratha Navy
 List of Maratha dynasties and states
 Maratha War of Independence
 Battles involving the Maratha Empire
 Maratha Army
 Maratha titles
 Military history of India
 List of people involved in the Maratha Empire

References 

Buildings and structures of the Maratha Empire
Forts in Raigad district
16th-century forts in India
Tourist attractions in Pune district
Former populated places in India
Hiking trails in India

Hiking